Jad Mouaddib (born 5 April 1999) is a French professional footballer who plays as a midfielder for Belgian club Virton.

International career
Mouaddib has represented France at youth international level.

Career statistics

Club

Notes

References

1999 births
Living people
People from Lens, Pas-de-Calais
French sportspeople of Moroccan descent
French footballers
Footballers from Hauts-de-France
Association football midfielders
Stade Malherbe Caen players
US Granville players
FCV Farul Constanța players
R.E. Virton players
Championnat National 3 players
Championnat National 2 players
Challenger Pro League players
French expatriate footballers
French expatriate sportspeople in Romania
Expatriate footballers in Romania
French expatriate sportspeople in Belgium
Expatriate footballers in Belgium